The 2017 Lady Wigram Trophy was the 56th running of the Lady Wigram Trophy and served as the first round of the 2017 Toyota Racing Series. The event was held at the Mike Pero Motorsport Park, in Christchurch, New Zealand from 13 to 15 January 2017. 

The defending Lady Wigram Trophy winner was Force India protégé, Jehan Daruvala. He would repeat his feat by winning the Lady Wigram Trophy for the second year in a row.

Background 
The 2017 Toyota Racing Series sees the highest number of returning drivers (Brendon Leitch, Thomas Randle, Pedro Piquet, Jehan Daruvala, Ferdinand Habsburg, Kami Laliberté and Taylor Cockerton) since 2013 with seven.

Defending champion, Lando Norris initially announced intentions to return to the series for 2017 to defend his title. However, he later announced his withdrawal. The vacant seat would be taken by Frenchman, Jean Baptiste Simmenauer.

Report

Practice 

For the first practice session of the weekend, Enaam Ahmed achieved the fastest lap time with a 1:18.200, followed closely by Thomas Randle and Richard Verschoor. The session was relatively clean, with only two spins in the session (Andres and Laliberté). The second practice session was equally as uneventful with Thomas Randle lowering the best time down to a 1:18.147, with the closest two rivals being Shelby Blackstock and Jehan Daruvala. For the third and final practice session, several drivers broke into the 17's, with Taylor Cockerton being the fastest of all with a 1:17.383. He was followed by Thomas Randle and Enaam Ahmed.

Race 1

Qualifying 
Jehan Daruvala continued his fine form at the Mike Pero Motorsport Park by grabbing the first pole position of the year with a 1:17.424.

Race 
After a great start from Daruvala, a safety car caused by Enders stranded car closed the field up once again. On the restart, Armstrong got onto the gearbox of Daruvala, and committed to a brave move around the outside to take the lead and ultimately the win.

Race 2 
In the reverse grid race, Thomas Randle took his first Toyota Racing Series win, followed by Verschoor and Armstrong. 
When crossing the line Taylor Cockerton was first, followed by Piquet and Randle. Cockerton and Piquet got a time penalty and therefore dropped in the race result.

Race 3

Qualifying 
Daruvala once again took the pole with a tight margin over Armstrong and Ahmed.

Race 
In what was an incident-marred race, Daruvala took his second consecutive Lady Wigram Trophy with Ahmed and Piquet rounding out the podium.

Championship standings 

Drivers' Championship standings

References

Lady Wigram Trophy

Lady Wigram Trophy
Lady Wigram Trophy